The Winn Road School is a historic school building at the junction of Winn and Range Roads in Cumberland, Maine, United States.  Built in 1846, it is one of only two known surviving brick Greek Revival one-room schoolhouses in the state.  It was listed on the National Register of Historic Places in 1984.

Description and history

The Winn Road School stands amid fields in a rural part of southern Cumberland, on the east side of the junction of Winn and Range Roads.  It is a single-story brick structure, with a gabled roof and granite foundation.   Its main façade faces southwest toward Range Road and has a fully pedimented gable with a date block in the center, and sash windows flanking the door below.  Wall openings for the door and windows have granite lintels.  The side elevations have three sash windows each and the rear has two windows on the ground floor and a third at the attic level, now boarded over.  The interior has had significant alterations over the years, but has retained a sloping floor, an unusual feature for schools of the period.

The school was built in 1846, and was one of two similar schools built by the town at the time.  The other building also survives, but has been extensively altered.  This school served as an educational facility until the early 20th century, and was afterward used for other civic purposes.

See also
National Register of Historic Places listings in Cumberland County, Maine

References

School buildings on the National Register of Historic Places in Maine
Greek Revival architecture in Maine
Buildings and structures completed in 1846
Buildings and structures in Cumberland County, Maine
National Register of Historic Places in Cumberland County, Maine
Former school buildings in the United States